The 2000–01 season was the 88th competitive season in the history of Plymouth Argyle Football Club.

Third Division

Matches

Standings

FA Cup

Matches

League Cup

Matches

League Trophy

Matches

Players

First-team squad
Squad at end of season

Left club during season

Squad statistics

Appearances and goals

Transfers

Permanent

In

Out

Loans

In

Out

References
General

Specific

Notes

External links
Plymouth Argyle F.C. official website
Plymouth Argyle F.C. archive

2000-01
2000–01 Football League Third Division by team